The 1963–64 Idaho Vandals men's basketball team represented the University of Idaho during the 1963–64 NCAA University Division basketball season. In the inaugural year of the Big Sky Conference, the Vandals were led by first-year head coach Jim Goddard and played their home games on campus at the Memorial Gymnasium in Moscow, Idaho. They were 7–19 overall and 4–6 in conference play.

See also

1963–64 NCAA University Division men's basketball season
1963 in sports

References

External links
Sports Reference – Idaho Vandals: 1963–64 basketball season
Gem of the Mountains: 1964 University of Idaho yearbook – 1963–64 basketball season
Idaho Argonaut – student newspaper – 1964 editions

Idaho Vandals men's basketball seasons
Idaho
Idaho
Idaho